Zee Theatre is a platform service by Zee Entertainment Enterprises. It offers a collection of recorded theatre plays, also called teleplays, produced in India and abroad. Zee Theatre is developed by Zee Special Projects.

Zee Theatre was officially launched on 21 September 2018 on Tata Sky. Shailja Kejriwal was appointed as a Chief Creative, Special Projects at ZEEL

Since 2015, Zee Theatre has curated and produced over 80 acclaimed plays such as Gunehgaar, Sir Sir Sarla, Agnipankh, Ma Retire Hoti Hai, Saku Bai, Vaastav, Piya Behrupiya and Panchi Aise Aate Hai, among others. The library also includes some of the most celebrated stories across languages such as Hindi, Gujarati, Marathi and Bengali with magnificent production and refreshing music based on contemporary taste. Some of these plays include Doll’s House, Sakharam B and Choker Bali, among others.

Renowned theatre veterans like Mahesh Dattani, Makhrand Deshpande, Vijaya Mehta, Lillete Dubey, Atul Kumar, and also young stalwarts like Purva Naresh have recreated some of the most celebrated stories. It also features stories from popular writers such as Vijay Tendulkar, Badal Sircar, Rabindranath Tagore and others, and brought them to life on the small screen. These teleplays stars remarkable actors such as Aahana Kumra, Ashutosh Rana, Divya Dutta, Swara Bhaskar, Sonali Kulkarni, Rajeev Khandelwal, Jim Sarabh, Joy Sengupta, Shilpa Tulaskar, Himani Shivpuri, Usha Ganguly, Swastika Mukherjee, Ira Dubey, Lillete Dubey, and many others.

In May 2022, Zee Theatre broadcast international plays including The Sound of Music Live! , Hairspray Live , Peter Pan Live! and Billy Elliot: The Musical.

In Nov and Dec. 2022, Zee Theatre launched two new teleplays Shadyantra and Koi Baat Chale with some of the best actors like Gopal Datt, Vineet Kumar, Manoj Pahwa, Hina Khan, Kunaal Roy Kapur & Chandan Roy Sanyal. Koi Baat Chale is directed by Mayank Pahwa & Seema Pahwa.

References

Zee Entertainment Enterprises
Theatre in India
2018 establishments in Maharashtra